The U.S. Open of Surfing is a week-long surfing competition held annually during the summer in Huntington Beach, California.  Generally held on the south side of the Huntington Beach Pier, the U.S. Open is part of the qualification process for the World Surf League and is a WSL QS 10,000 event.  It is the largest surfing competition in the world. It has been owned by IMG since 2000.

As part of the event, notable people in the world of surfing are added to the Surfing Walk of Fame and to the Surfers' Hall of Fame, both directly across from the pier.

History
The U.S. Open, then called the West Coast Surfing Championship, was first held in 1959.  In 1964 it became known as the United States Surfing Championships. In 1982 it became known as the OP Pro for its sponsor, Ocean Pacific.  The event was renamed the U.S. Open of Surfing in 1994.

The contest was traditionally held during Labor Day weekend.  The event was changed to an earlier date following the 1986 event when riots occurred at the OP Pro.

Rioting again marred the 2013 U.S. Open. On the final day of the event, as the crowds left the contest area and filled Main Street, a civil disturbance erupted, resulting in property damage and several arrests and some injuries.  As a result, the event owner IMG stated that in 2014 it will discontinue events such as free concerts and focus more on the sport.

Spending at the nine-day event adds $21.5 million to the Orange County economy and $16.4 million in Huntington Beach.  It is attended by nearly 500,000 people.

Champions

West Coast Surfing Champions
1959: Jack Haley, Linda Benson

1960: Mike Haley, Linda Benson

1961: Ron Sizemore, Linda Benson

1962: Ilima Kalama, Gudie Wilkie

1963: LJ Richards, Candy Calhoun

United States Surfing Champions
1964: Jim Craig, Linda Benson

1965: Mark Martinson, Joyce Hoffman

1966: Corky Carroll, Joyce Hoffman

1967: Corky Carroll, Joyce Hoffman

1968: David Nuuhiwa, Linda Benson

1969: Corky Carroll, Sharron Weber

1970: David Nuuhiwa, Joyce Hoffman

1971: Brad McCaul, Jericho Poppler

1972: Dale Dobson,  Mary Setterholm

Op Pro Champions
1982: Cheyne Horan, Becky Benson

1983: Tom Curren, Kim Mearig

1984: Tom Curren, Frieda Zamba

1985: Mark Occhilupo, Jodie Cooper

1986: Mark Occhilupo, Frieda Zamba

1987: Barton Lynch, Wendy Botha

1988: Tom Curren, Jorja Smith

1989: Richie Collins, Frieda Zamba

1990: Todd Holland, Frieda Zamba

1991: Barton Lynch, Frieda Zamba

1992: Team USA (Kelly Slater, Richie Collins, Todd Holland, Mike Parsons, Alisa Schwarzstein)

1993: Sunny Garcia, Kim Mearig

U.S. Open Champions
1994: Shane Beschen, Lisa Andersen

1995: Rob Machado, Neridah Falconer

1996: Kelly Slater, Layne Beachley

1997: Beau Emerton, Rochelle Ballard

1998: Andy Irons, Layne Beachley

1999: Shea Lopez, Keala Kennelly

2000: Sunny Garcia, Tita Tavares

2001: Rob Machado, Pauline Menczer

2002: Kalani Robb, Pauline Menczer

2003: Cory Lopez, Chelsea Georgeson

2004: Taj Burrow, Chelsea Georgeson

2005: Andy Irons, Julia Christian

2006: Rob Machado, Sofia Mulanovich

2007: C.J. Hobgood, Stephanie Gilmore

2008: Nathaniel Curran, Malia Manuel

2009: Brett Simpson, Courtney Conlogue

2010: Brett Simpson, Carissa Moore

2011: Kelly Slater, Sally Fitzgibbons

2012: Julian Wilson, Lakey Peterson

2013: Alejo Muniz, Carissa Moore

2014: Filipe Toledo, Tyler Wright

2015: Hiroto Ohhara, Johanne Defay

2016: Filipe Toledo, Tatiana Weston-Webb

2017: Kanoa Igarashi, Sage Erickson

2018: Kanoa Igarashi, Courtney Conlogue

2019: Yago Dora, Sage Erickson

2020: Cancelled

2021: Griffin Colapinto, Caitlin Simmers

2022: Ezekiel Lau, Bettylou-Sakura Johnson

2023: Robert Wayne Grilho III, Puamakamae DeSoto

U.S. Open of Longboarding Champions

Awards
Notable people are inducted into Surfing Walk of Fame and Surfers' Hall of Fame each year during the U.S. Open.  The Walk of Fame has plaques imbedded in the sidewalk, while the Hall of Fame has handprints.  Each are located across the street from one another and across Pacific Coast Highway from the Huntington Beach Pier.

Surfing Walk of Fame
Every year the Surfing Walk of Fame at Huntington Beach inducts members in the categories of surf pioneers, surfing champions, local heroes, surf culture, woman of the year, and honor roll. Eligibility for each award are as follows:

The surf champion must have held the world championship and/or world class event titles specific to the city of Huntington Beach.
Woman of the Year winners are chosen based on who garners the most collective votes from the surfing champions, surfing culture, surf pioneers, and local heroes categories.
Local Hero award winners have either resided in Huntington Beach for ten years or graduated from the Huntington Beach Union High School District and were finalists in the surfing champions category, contributed to Huntington Beach surfing culture, were surf pioneers in the city, or were champions of the annual Huntington Beach City Championships.

Surfers' Hall of Fame
Inductees by year are as follows:
2022: Peter Mel, Martin Daly, Michele Turner
2019: Janice Aragon, Kai Lenny, Sam Hawk
2018: Ben Aipa, Herbie Fletcher, Brett Simpson
2017: Mick Fanning, Bethany Hamilton
2016: Blaine "Sumo" Sato, Shawn Stussy, Ryan Turner
2015: Gordon "Grubby" Clark, C.J. Hobgood, John Davis
2014: Timmy Turner, Carissa Moore, Rusty Preisendorfer 
2013: Skip Frye, Rick "Rockin' Fig" Fignetti, Shane Dorian
2012: Rabbit Kekai, Dane Reynolds, Andy Verdone 
2011: George Downing, Chuck Linnen, Simon Anderson, Taylor Knox
2010: Stephanie Gilmore, Ian Cairns, Randy Lewis 
2009: Dick Baker, Chris Hawk, Joey Buran, Pat O'Connell, Bruce Brown, Jeff Hakman
2008: Wayne “Rabbit” Bartholomew, Sean Collins, Brad Gerlach, Mike Parsons
2007: Martin Potter, Bruce Irons, Al Merrick, Sofia Mulanovich
2006: Layne Beachley, Bob Hurley, Rob Machado, Greg Noll
2005: Carl Hayward, Tom Carroll, Bob McKnight, Mark Richards
2004: David Nuuhiwa, Jack Haley, Jericho Poppler, Mark Occhilupo, Peter "PT" Townend, Gerry Lopez 
2003: Andy Irons, Shaun Tomson, Tom Curren, Jack O’Neill, Bud Llamas, Paul Strauch, Mike Doyle 
2002: Laird Hamilton, Lisa Andersen, Kelly Slater, Joel Tudor, Robert “Wingnut” Weaver, Robert August, Corky Carroll

References

External links
Official Website

World Surf League
Surfing competitions in California
Surfing in the United States
Tourist attractions in Orange County, California
Sports in Huntington Beach, California
1959 establishments in California
Recurring sporting events established in 1959